Marlia Mundell Mango is a Byzantine archaeologist and historian at the University of Oxford, where she was University Lecturer in Byzantine Archaeology and Art (1995-2008).

Biography 
Mango graduated with a BA from Newton College,  Massachusetts  in 1964. Subsequently, Mango was a curator and archaeologist at the research library of Dumbarton Oaks.

In 1985, Mango was awarded a DPhil from the University of Oxford on the subject of 'Artistic patronage in the Roman diocese of Oriens, 313–641 AD’, supervised by Martin Harrison.

Mango is currently the Director of Excavations for the Byzantine site of Androna in modern Syria, and an emeritus research fellow at St John's College, Oxford.

Her husband was Cyril Mango and she worked with him on St Catherine's Monastery at Mount Sinai.

Honours 
Mango's 1986 monograph Silver from Early Byzantium. The Kaper Koraon and Related Treasures was awarded the Prix Gustave Schlumberger (Académie des Inscriptions et Belles-Lettres, Institut de France). In 1999, Mango was awarded the Frend Medal by the Society of Antiquaries of London. In 2017, a festchrift was published in honour of Mango, entitled Discipuli dona ferentes: Glimpses of Byzantium in Honour of Marlia Mundell Mango, containing contributions on Byzantine art and archaeology.

Works 
 The churches and monasteries of the Ṭur ʻAbdin (1982)
 Silver from early Byzantium (1986)
 The Sevso Treasure (1994)
 Byzantine trade, 4th-12th centuries (2004)

References

External links 
 List of Publications

Living people
Year of birth missing (living people)
British women archaeologists
Fellows of St John's College, Oxford
Alumni of University College, Oxford
British Byzantinists
Historians of Byzantine art
Byzantine archaeologists
Women Byzantinists
Women medievalists